David Addison-Smith (9 January 1873 — 2 November 1937) was a Scottish first-class cricketer and solicitor.

The son of R. Addison-Smith, he was born at Edinburgh in January 1873. He was educated at both the Royal High School of Edinburgh and Craigmount High School. After completing his education, he trained to become a solicitor and was admitted to practice as one in June 1895. He practised as an agent for the poor in civil cases, and later replaced his deceased father as law agent to the City of Edinburgh Council. He was also a partner in the family law firm R. Addison-Smith & Co. A keen cricketer, Addison-Smith played club cricket for Grange. At the turn of the 20th-century, he was considered the best all-rounder in Scottish cricket, completing the double of 1,000 runs and 100 wickets in the 1900 season. Having played for Scotland in minor matches since 1892, Addison-Smith played in their inaugural first-class match against the touring Australians at Edinburgh in 1905. Opening the batting twice in the match, he was dismissed for 14 runs in Scotland's first innings by Bill Howell, while in their second innings he was dismissed for 45 runs by Charlie McLeod. With his slow left-arm orthodox bowling, he took the wicket of McLeod in the Australians first innings. Addison-Smith died at Leith in November 1937.

References

External links
 

1873 births
1937 deaths
Cricketers from Edinburgh
People educated at the Royal High School, Edinburgh
People educated at Craigmount High School
Scottish cricketers
Scottish solicitors